The 2021–22 season is Leyton Orient's 123rd year in their history and third consecutive season in League Two. Along with the league, the club will also compete in the FA Cup, the EFL Cup and the EFL Trophy. The season covers the period from 1 July 2021 to 30 June 2022.

Transfers

Transfers in

Loans in

Loans out

Transfers out

Pre-season and friendlies
Leyton Orient announced friendly matches against Dundee, West Ham United, Tottenham Hotspur, Maidenhead United, Dulwich Hamlet, Gillingham, and Heybridge Swifts as part of their pre-season preparations.

Competitions

League Two

League table

Results summary

Results by matchday

Matches
The U's fixtures were announced on 24 June 2021.

FA Cup

Leyton Orient were drawn at home to Ebbsfleet United in the first round, Tranmere Rovers in the second round and away to Stoke City in the third round.

EFL Cup

Orient were drawn at home to Queens Park Rangers in the first round.

EFL Trophy

Leyton were drawn into Southern Group G alongside Charlton Athletic, Crawley Town and Southampton U21s. The dates for the group stage matches were confirmed on July 14.

Player statistics

|-
! colspan="14" style="background:#dcdcdc; text-align:center"| Goalkeepers

|-
! colspan="14" style="background:#dcdcdc; text-align:center"| Defenders

|-
! colspan="14" style="background:#dcdcdc; text-align:center"| Midfielders

|-
! colspan="14" style="background:#dcdcdc; text-align:center"| Forwards

|-
! colspan="14" style="background:#dcdcdc; text-align:center"| Out on Loan

|-
! colspan="14" style="background:#dcdcdc; text-align:center"| Left the club during the Season

|-

Top scorers
Includes all competitive matches. The list is sorted by squad number when total goals are equal.

Last updated 7 May 2022

References

Leyton Orient
Leyton Orient F.C. seasons
Leyton Orient
Leyton Orient